The 1908 Northern Illinois State Normal football team represented Northern Illinois State Normal College as an independent in the 1908 college football season. They were led by third-year head coach Nelson A. Kellogg and played their home games at Glidden Field, located on the east end of campus. The team finished the season with a 1–5–1 record. Irwin Madden was the team's captain.

Schedule

References

Northern Illinois State
Northern Illinois Huskies football seasons
Northern Illinois State Normal football